Pencarrow is an English country house in Cornwall, England.

Pencarrow may also refer to the following places:

 Pencarrow, Advent, a hamlet in Advent parish, Cornwall, England
 Pencarrow (New Zealand electorate), a former electorate in New Zealand
 Pencarrow Head, a headland at the entrance to Wellington Harbour, New Zealand
 Pencarrow Head, Cornwall, a headland in Lanteglos-by-Fowey, Cornwall, England